Vincent John McCarthy (November 3, 1899 – November 1968) was an American football player who played for three years with the Rock Island Independents of the National Football League (NFL) and the first American Football League.

Once he became owner of the team in 1924, Dale Johnson made McCarthy, who was the team's back-up quarterback, his new general manager.

References

1899 births
1968 deaths
National Football League general managers
Rock Island Independents players
Rock Island Independents (AFL) players
St. Viator Irish football players